Alex Bolt (born 5 January 1993) is an Australian professional tennis player. He plays mainly on the ATP Challenger Tour. His career-high rankings by the Association of Tennis Professionals (ATP) are world No. 125 in singles and world No. 81 in doubles. Highlights of Bolt's career thus far include quarterfinal appearances at the 2014 Australian Open men's doubles and at the 2017 Australian Open with Andrew Whittington and Bradley Mousley respectively.

Personal life
Bolt was born in Murray Bridge, South Australia. He began playing tennis at the age of seven and also spent time playing Australian rules football and basketball throughout his youth. During his hiatus from tennis in 2016, Bolt began playing local football for the Mypolonga Tigers in River Murray Football League and worked as a fence-builder.

Bolt is an avid supporter of the Port Adelaide Football Club in the Australian Football League.

In August 2021, Bolt tested positive for COVID-19.

Career

2010-2012: Career beginnings 
Bolt began his tennis career in Murray Bridge competing in the Murray Bridge Lawn Tennis Association. He made his ITF debut in October 2010 at the Australia F8, where he made the second round. 

Throughout 2011, Bolt competed on the Futures circuit. His best performance was a semi final result in the Australian F7 in September. Bolt finished 2011 with a ranking of 897.

Bolt lost in the first round of qualifying for the 2012 Brisbane International to countryman, Luke Saville. 
Bolt spent the rest of 2012 competing on the Futures Circuit and reached his first final and winning the Australian F7 in Happy Valley, South Australia; this was his first career title. He competed in four finals from October–December; winning one. Bolt ended 2012 with a ranking of 483.

2013
Bolt entered the qualifying rounds of Sydney International, where he made the second round, before losing to Guillermo Garcia-Lopez. He also made the second round of qualifying for the 2013 Australian Open, losing a tight contest 4–6, 7–5, 6–8 to Florent Serra.

Between February and May, Bolt competed in a number of Future tournaments, making the semi finals in Australia F1, F2 and China F1.
He lost in the first round of qualifying in the 2013 French Open to James Duckworth.

From June – September, Bolt played a number of Futures throughout Europe, mainly on clay, before returning to Australia the play in the futures there. his best result reaching the final of Cairns F7, losing to his doubles partner Andrew Whittington, 4–6, 4–6. Bolt ended 2013 with a ranking of 364.

2014: Major wildcard & debut in doubles, First Challenger title
Bolt was given wildcards into both the 2014 Brisbane International and 2014 Australian Open qualifying, but lost in round 1 in both. Whittington and Bolt were given wildcards into the Men's doubles main draw. The pair defeated the No. 3 seeds David Marrero and Fernando Verdasco in round two, ultimately losing at the quarter-final stage to number 8 seed Daniel Nestor and Nenad Zimonjić. The match was played on Rod Laver Arena; the pairs first appearance on centre court.

In February, he made the quarter final of the Burnie Challenger, losing to eventual runner-up Hiroki Moriya; before playing a number of Australian Futures, winning the F4 and coming runner-up in F5.

Bolt's won his first ATP Challenger Tour on May 3 at the China International against Nikola Mektić in straight sets, increasing his ranking to a career high of #240. He also won the doubles, pairing with Andrew Whittington. At Wimbledon, Bolt fell just short of making his grand slam debut, losing in the final round of qualifying to Russian Konstantin Kravchuk in four sets. In September, Bolt made the semi-finals of the Napa Challenger.

2015: Masters 1000 debut
Bolt commenced 2015 at the Onkaparinga Challenger where he lost in the semifinals to Ryan Harrison.
Bolt missed the 2015 Australian Open singles, but played in the doubles as a wildcard pair with A. Whittington, reaching the third round. In February, Bolt made his second career ATP Challenger Tour final in Burnie. He lost in straight sets to Chung Hyeon.

In March, Bolt made his first ATP Masters 1000 main draw in Indian Wells, after two wins in qualification. He lost in straight sets to Robin Haase in the 1st round. 

He lost in the first round of qualifying for the French Open to Bjorn Fratangelo, before turning to grass, where he completed in and qualified for three challenger events in a row, at Manchester, Surbiton and Ilkley. Bolt played the North America from July to August with limited success, before returning to Australia's futures circuit where he made the final of the Cairns F7, but lost in three sets to Finn Tearney. In October and November, Bolt made quarter finals of both the Latrobe and Canberra Challengers.  

Bolt finished 2015 with a singles ranking of No. 269.

2016: Hiatus
Bolt commenced 2016 at the Onkaparinga Challenger when he made the quarter final. He lost in the first round of qualifying for the 2016 Australian Open. In January and February, Bolt made the quarter final of the Maui Challenger and Launceston Challenger, before returning to play three ITF tournaments across Australia, before taking a tennis hiatus that would last the remainder of the year.

Bolt ended 2016 with a ranking of No. 586.

2017: Return to tennis and singles Grand Slam debut 
Bolt returned from a 9-month hiatus in January 2017 to qualify for the Happy Valley Challenger. Bolt said; “This is my first tournament since March so it’s good to be back. I’m loving playing tennis again. It’s great fun and hopefully this run continues.” Bolt defeated Tatsuma Ito before losing to Omar Jasika in round 2. 

Bolt then qualified for the 2017 Australian Open, defeating Marius Copil, Matthias Bachinger and Julien Benneteau. This was Bolt's grand slam single debut. He lost to Yoshihito Nishioka in round 1. In Doubles, Bolt paired with Bradley Mousley where he reached the quarter finals for the second time. Bolt reached the quarterfinals of both the Burnie International and Launceston International, but reached the finals in the Launceston doubles with Andrew Whittington. In February, Bolt travelled to Asia but failed to qualify for any Challenger events in singles, before returning to the futures tour in Australia. In May, Bolt travelled to Europe, where he qualified for and made the final of the Ilkley Trophy, losing to Marton Fucsovics in straight sets. This was Bolt's first appearance in a Challenger final for two years. With the result, his ranking jumped from 438 to 306 in the world. In October, Bolt made his second Challenger tour final of the season at Traralgon where he lost to fellow Aussie Jason Kubler in three tight sets.

In December, Bolt competed in the Australian Wildcard Playoff for a spot in the 2018 Australian Open. Despite losing to Alex De Minaur in the final, Bolt's performance throughout the tournament and strong 2017 earned him a discretionary wildcard into the Australian Open. He also received a wildcard into the main draw of the doubles with partner Bradley Mousley, who he made the quarter finals with in 2017. 

Bolt finished the year with a singles ranking of No. 192, an improvement of almost 400 places from the end of 2016. Bolt also had a handy year on the doubles circuit, making five Challenger finals with three victories to finish the season ranked No. 86, a career high doubles ranking.

2018: First ATP Singles win
Bolt started the season in his home state of South Australia at the inaugural Playford Challenger event, where he lost to Jason Kubler. 

Bolt received a wildcard into the 2018 Sydney International in both singles and doubles, partnering compatriot Jordan Thompson. In the singles draw, Bolt lost in the first round to Ričardas Berankis. 

At the Australian Open Bolt lost to Viktor Troicki as a wildcard in the first round in 5 sets. Bolt partnered Brad Mousley for doubles and lost in round 1 in 3 sets.
In March, Bolt qualified for and won the Zhuhai Challenger. 

In June, Bolt won his first ATP World Tour match at the Rosmalen Grass Court Championships, defeating Vasek Pospisil in round 1.

At the 2018 Wimbledon Championships Bolt qualified for the first time for the singles main draw of this Grand Slam. He lost to 21st seed Kyle Edmund in the first round. Bolt also partnered 2002 Men's singles Wimbledon champion Lleyton Hewitt in doubles after the pair received a wildcard. The pair lost also in the first round. In July, Bolt qualified for Hall of Fame Tennis Championships, Atlanta and Washington but lost in first round of all three. In August, Bolt lost in the final round of qualifying for the US Open.

2019: First Grand Slam win and third round in singles  
Bolt received a wildcard into the Brisbane International but lost in round 1. 

Bolt received a wildcard in the Australian Open where he defeated Jack Sock in four sets for his first Grand Slam win. He defeated Gilles Simon in the second round after saving four match points in the 4th set but lost to Alexander Zverev in the third round, 3–6, 3–6, 2–6.

In August, Bolt lost in the first round of 2019 US Open – Men's singles qualifying. Bolt finished the year with a ranking of World No. 159.

2020: First ATP Tour quarterfinal 
In January 2020, Bolt reached the quarter final of the 2020 Adelaide International as a wildcard.

He was awarded a wildcard into the 2020 Australian Open and played Albert Ramos Viñolas in round 1, winning in five sets, before losing in the second round in 5 sets to eventual finalist, Dominic Thiem. Bolt finished the year with a ranking of World No. 171.

2021: Second ATP Tour quarterfinal
He was awarded a fourth wildcard in a row for the Australian Open main draw where he lost to Grigor Dimitrov in the second round.

In June, Bolt won the 2021 Nottingham Trophy Challenger as a qualifier defeating Kamil Majchrzak. Following this successful run, Bolt received a wildcard to the Wimbledon main draw.

In July 2021, Bolt reached his second ATP Tour singles quarterfinal at Los Cabos. Bolt finished the year with a ranking of World No. 137.

2022: Fifth consecutive singles wildcard entry into Australian Open
Bolt was awarded, for a fifth consecutive year, a wildcard into the 2022 Australian Open. He lost to Alejandro Davidovich Fokina in the first round. 
Bolt took a break from tennis, returning in October, winning the M25 Cairns on return.

Bolt finished the year with a ranking of World No. 692.

2023: Tenth Australian Open wildcard and third round in doubles 
He received a wildcard to participate in the doubles event at the 2023 Australian Open  partnering Luke Saville where they reached the third round.

Challenger and Futures finals

Singles: 21 (8–13)

Doubles: 30 (17–13)

Performance timelines

Singles 
Current through the 2022 Miami Open.

Doubles 
Current through the 2022 Australian Open.

References

External links
 
 
 

Australian male tennis players
1993 births
Living people
Tennis people from South Australia
21st-century Australian people